"Forever" (also known as "Forever Dead") is the second single from album Cold Day Memory by American rock band Sevendust. The single was released in radio stations on July 26. The song was made available for streaming on the band's official MySpace page and YouTube account on February 5, 2010. Also was made available for purchase on the iTunes Store on March 30, 2010. The song was originally titled "Forever Dead", with advance copies of the album using that title instead of "Forever".

Charts

References

2010 singles
2010 songs
Sevendust songs
Songs written by Clint Lowery
Songs written by Morgan Rose
Songs written by John Connolly (musician)
Songs written by Lajon Witherspoon
Songs written by Vinnie Hornsby
Song recordings produced by Johnny K